Aglaiocercus is a genus of hummingbird in the family Trochilidae. It contains the following species:

 
Bird genera
Taxa named by John T. Zimmer
Taxonomy articles created by Polbot